Catahoula Parish is a parish in the U.S. state of Louisiana.  As of the 2020 census, the population was 8,906. Its seat is Harrisonburg, on the Ouachita River. The parish was formed in 1808, shortly after the United States acquired this territory in the Louisiana Purchase of 1803.

History

Prehistory

Catahoula Parish was the home to many succeeding Native American groups in the thousands of years before European settlements began. Peoples of the Marksville culture, Troyville culture, Coles Creek culture and Plaquemine culture built villages and mound sites throughout the area. Notable examples include Peck Mounds, and the Troyville Earthworks. The Troyville Earthworks have components dating from 100 BCE to 700 CE during the Baytown to the Troyville-Coles Creek periods.

This mound was destroyed to make way for the Jonesville bridge over the Black River.

Historic era
This area was settled primarily by migrants from the southern United States after the Louisiana Purchase, when the US acquired the vast, former French-claimed territory west of the Mississippi River. White migrants to north and central Louisiana were from the South, and were mainly of British descent and Protestant religions. They brought a new influence into Louisiana. Some also brought or purchased African-American slaves to work on larger plantations. Many of these were from the Upper South, which sold slaves through the domestic market. They brought their own cultural influences as well.

The parish was founded in 1808 and originally incorporated a very large area. As population increased in the region, new parishes were organized from the territory first included in Catahoula Parish. The parish was divided by the state in 1910, when La Salle Parish was formed from its old western section. As one of the new parishes organized during early United States settlement of this part of the state, it has had the third most boundary changes since that time. Only Natchitoches and Ouachita parishes have had more revisions of boundaries.

Catahoula dog

Catahoula Parish lays claim to its namesake Catahoula Leopard dog breed. The Catahoula breed was owned by Colonel James "Jim" Bowie of the Alamo and his brother Rezin Bowie, both of Louisiana. During the early 1900s, Theodore Roosevelt used the Catahoula when hunting. Louisiana Governor Earl Kemp Long also collected these dogs.

Geography
It is home to Sandy Lake.

Major highways

Adjacent parishes
 Franklin Parish  (north)
 Tensas Parish  (northeast)
 Concordia Parish  (east)
 Avoyelles Parish  (south)
 La Salle Parish  (west)
 Caldwell Parish  (northwest)

National protected area
 Catahoula National Wildlife Refuge (part)

Demographics

2020 census

As of the 2020 United States census, there were 8,906 people, 3,364 households, and 2,421 families residing in the parish.

2000 census
As of the census of 2000, there were 10,920 people, 4,082 households, and 2,992 families residing in the parish.  The population density was 16 people per square mile (6/km2).  There were 5,351 housing units at an average density of 8 per square mile (3/km2).  The racial makeup of the parish was 71.78% White, 27.12% Black or African American, 0.19% Native American, 0.13% Asian, 0.19% from other races, and 0.59% from two or more races.  0.92% of the population were Hispanic or Latino of any race.

There were 4,082 households, out of which 32.70% had children under the age of 18 living with them, 54.70% were married couples living together, 14.50% had a female householder with no husband present, and 26.70% were non-families. 24.30% of all households were made up of individuals, and 11.30% had someone living alone who was 65 years of age or older.  The average household size was 2.55 and the average family size was 3.02.

In the parish the population was spread out, with 25.80% under the age of 18, 10.00% from 18 to 24, 26.80% from 25 to 44, 23.00% from 45 to 64, and 14.40% who were 65 years of age or older.  The median age was 37 years. For every 100 females there were 100.60 males.  For every 100 females age 18 and over, there were 98.00 males.

The median income for a household in the parish was $22,528, and the median income for a family was $27,206. Males had a median income of $26,181 versus $18,427 for females. The per capita income for the parish was $12,608.  About 22.60% of families and 28.10% of the population were below the poverty line, including 41.80% of those under age 18 and 20.10% of those age 65 or over.

Education
Catahoula Parish School Board operates local public schools.

National Guard
The 1087TH Transportation Company of the 165TH CSS (combat service support) Battalion of the 139TH RSG (regional support group) resides in Jonesville, Louisiana.

Communities

Town
 Jonesville

Villages
 Harrisonburg
 Sicily Island

Unincorporated areas

Census-designated place 
 Wallace Ridge

Unincorporated communities 
 Aimwell
 Enterprise
 Foules
 Larto
 Leland
 Manifest
 Sandy Lake

Notable people
 William B. Atkins, former member of both houses of the state legislature; resident of Jonesville
 Leo Boothe, longest serving District Judge of Catahoula Parish and Concordia Parish. (1991-2015)
 J. C. "Sonny" Gilbert, late state senator and state representative
 Ralph E. King, Winnsboro physician who represented Catahoula Parish in the Louisiana State Senate from 1944 to 1952 and again from 1956 to 1960
 Moses J. Liddell was appointed by President Grover Cleveland as a judge for the Supreme Court of the Montana Territory
 St. John Richardson Liddell, Confederate general in the American Civil War, owned large plantation in Catahoula Parish
 Charles A. Marvin, late judge based in Webster Parish
 Sara T. Mayo, physician and humanitarian reformer
 David I. Patten, late state representative
 Joe Raymond Peace, football coach
 William S. Peck, Jr., politician
 William S. Peck, Sr., politician
 Dan Richey, former member of both houses of the state legislature
 Chris Shivers, two-time (2000, 2003) PBR World Champion bull rider

Politics

Although the parish trends Democratic in local elections, in the 2008 presidential election, Barack Obama of Illinois received only 1,659 votes (31.8 percent) compared to 3,486 (66.7 percent) for the Republican nominee, John S. McCain of Arizona. The 2008 totals mirrored those of 2004, when Catahoula Parish cast 3,219 (65.0 percent) for President George W. Bush and 1,673 ballots (34.8 percent) for his Democratic rival, Senator John F. Kerry of Massachusetts. Local officials are almost entirely Democratic in affiliation. Republicans rarely contest such elections.

See also
 Jones-Liddell feud
 National Register of Historic Places listings in Catahoula Parish, Louisiana

 USS Catahoula Parish (LST-528)

References

External links

 Heinrich, P. V., 2008, Woodville 30 x 60 minute geologic quadrangle. Louisiana Geological Survey, Baton Rouge, Louisiana.
 DiscoverCatahoula.com Community Website for Catahoula Parish, LA

 
Louisiana placenames of Native American origin
1808 establishments in the Territory of Orleans
Populated places established in 1808